Broadway or Bust is a 1924 American silent Western comedy film directed by Edward Sedgwick and starring Hoot Gibson. It was produced and distributed by Universal Pictures.

Cast

Preservation
With no prints of Broadway or Bust located in any film archives, it is a lost film.

See also
 Hoot Gibson filmography
 Gertrude Astor filmography

References

External links

 
 

1924 films
Lost Western (genre) films
Films directed by Edward Sedgwick
Universal Pictures films
1924 Western (genre) films
Lost American films
American black-and-white films
1924 lost films
Silent American Western (genre) films
1920s American films
1920s English-language films